Hagelin may refer to:

 Albert Viljam Hagelin (1881–1946), Norwegian World War II collaborationist and minister
 Bobbie Hagelin (born 1984), Swedish hockey player
 Boris Hagelin (1892–1983), Swedish businessman and inventor of a cryptography machine (see M-209)
 Carl Hagelin (born 1988), Swedish hockey player
 Dagmar Hagelin  (1959 – c. 1977), Argentine-Swedish girl who disappeared during the Dirty Wars
 Gustaf Hagelin (1897–1983), Swedish horse rider
 Joakim Hagelin (born 1989), Swedish ice hockey player
 John Hagelin (born 1954), US scientist and politician
 Robert Hagelin (1884 – after 1938), Norwegian politician

Germanic-language surnames
Swedish-language surnames